Bloody Mary is an extraterrestrial vampire in the DC Comics universe, and a junior member of the Female Furies. She first appeared in Hawk and Dove (vol. 2) #21 (February 1991) and was created by Karl Kesel making her one of the few characters related to Darkseid not to have been created by Jack Kirby.

Concept and creation
Bloody Mary was created by Karl Kesel and debuted in the Hawk and Dove issue "Girls Night Out". She made subsequent appearances in the Adventures of Superman and Wonder Girl titles. She is a different character than the Bloody Mary supervillain featured in the Batwoman comics. The character and name derives in part from the folklore legend of Bloody Mary, a ghost who is said to appear in a mirror when her name is chanted repeatedly.

Fictional character biography
A member of the junior Female Furies, Bloody Mary is an energy vampire that enjoys sucking the life out of her victims. She also flies using a disk and can project energy out of her eyes that can hypnotically manipulate her enemies. She hates being touched, and will attack anyone who dares to do so. She has only worked with the Furies on a few occasions.

When a mysterious figure began murdering various New Gods, Bloody Mary joined her warrior sisters in an unsuccessful attempt to have Wonder Girl join their ranks for further protection. Bloody Mary was killed in the "Clash of the Titans" issue of Wonder Girl in 2008 during a fight alongside other members of the Female Furies. She was killed by Infinity-Man, and has not returned since.

Powers and abilities
Bloody Mary can absorb energy from her victims through vampiric blood sucking. After this is done she can mentally control her victims. She can project beams from her eyes that are able to telekinetically move objects or people. Mary also possesses the ability to sense the presence of other beings in her immediate area.

Other versions

Sovereign Seven
Bloody Mary appears in the Sovereign Seven series, and is killed after she tries to suck the life from Maitresse, althouhh the Sovereign Seven series is not considered part of DC universe continuity.

Reception
Anthony Avina of Comic Book Resources included Bloody Mary on a list of the ten most powerful members of the Female Furies, ranking her at number nine. The character was included on a Comic Book Resources list of "completely forgettable DC characters from the 90's", where writer Brianna Reeves said her role has been "rather limited" since her creation.

References

External links

Bloody Mary at the DCU Guide

Characters created by Karl Kesel
Comics characters introduced in 1991
New Gods of Apokolips
DC Comics aliens
DC Comics characters with superhuman senses
DC Comics deities
DC Comics demons
DC Comics vampires
DC Comics female supervillains
DC Comics characters who have mental powers
DC Comics telekinetics 
Fictional characters with energy-manipulation abilities 
Fictional characters with absorption or parasitic abilities